Maurice H. Kornberg School of Dentistry (commonly referred to as Kornberg School of Dentistry) is the dental school of Temple University, located in Philadelphia, Pennsylvania, United States. It is one of several dental schools in the state of Pennsylvania. The average incoming class is 125 students.

History 
Maurice H. Kornberg School of Dentistry was established in 1863 as Philadelphia Dental College and is the second oldest continually functioning dental school in the country. The school became part of Temple University in 1907. Formerly known as the Temple University School of Dentistry, the school's name was changed in December 2006 after a $10 million donation by the estate of Maurice H. Kornberg.

The school, located in North Philadelphia, is known for its clinical experience as well as community involvement. Kornberg has completed extensive renovations to the school that include a new Orthodontics department as well as a new Pediatrics department and entire restorative department.  This is all due to the aggressive expansion efforts of the dean, Dr. Amid Ismail with support from the school's Board of Visitors and Alumni.

Academics 
Maurice H. Kornberg School of Dentistry awards Doctor of Dental Medicine degrees.

The school also allows students to earn both Doctor of Dental Medicine and Master of Business Administration degrees in four or five years through a special program.

Departments 
Maurice H. Kornberg School of Dentistry includes the following departments:
Dental Public Health Sciences
Endodontics
Oral Maxillofacial Pathology Medicine and Surgery
Orthodontics
Pediatric Dentistry
Periodontology and Oral Implantology
Restorative Dentistry
Oral Health Sciences

Accreditation 
Maurice H. Kornberg School of Dentistry is currently accredited by the American Dental Association.

See also

American Student Dental Association

References 

Commonwealth System of Higher Education
Dental schools in Pennsylvania
Kornberg School of Dentistry
Universities and colleges in Philadelphia
Educational institutions established in 1863
Nicetown-Tioga, Philadelphia
1863 establishments in Pennsylvania